Amchaur is a small town and Village Development Committee in Baitadi District in Sudurpashchim Province of western Nepal. At the time of the 1991 Nepal census it had a population of 3,852 and had 700 houses in the town.

References

Populated places in Baitadi District